Aplastodiscus leucopygius is a species of frog in the family Hylidae, endemic to Brazil. Its natural habitats are subtropical or tropical moist lowland forests, rivers, intermittent freshwater marshes, plantations, rural gardens, heavily degraded former forests, and irrigated land.

Description
The snout is rounded, and a single vocal sac is on the throat. The iris is golden, tinged with orange around the edge, and the tympanum is clearly visible. The fingers and toes have large discs on the tips to help the frog retain grip when climbing. The dorsal surface of this frog is smooth and green, with a scattering of white spots, while the ventral surface is granular and cream-coloured with white flecks. The skin above the vent is ornamented by a short, white ridge.

Distribution
It is mainly found in forested areas near streams or temporary pools.

Reproduction
Breeding takes place in the rainy season between December and February. The male calls from trees close to a body of water to attract a female. Often, several males near each other form a chorus. On the arrival, a female selects a male in an elaborate courtship ritual. This ends with the inspection by the female of an underground nesting chamber already prepared in a wet, muddy place by the male. If this is approved, mating takes place, and a raft of eggs is laid inside it. The developing tadpoles remain in the nest until washed out by flooding, after which they continue their development in shallow streams.

Status
A. leucopygius is listed as being of Least Concern in the IUCN Red List of Threatened Species. It is a common species within its wide range and the population seems stable. It is adaptable in that, in addition to its native forest habitat, it is found in clearings, forest edges, plantations, and gardens.

References

Aplastodiscus
Amphibians described in 1985
Endemic fauna of Brazil
Taxonomy articles created by Polbot